Baron Hindlip, of Hindlip in the County of Worcester and of Alsop-en-le-Dale in the County of Derby, is a title in the Peerage of the United Kingdom. It was created in 1886 for the businessman and Conservative politician Sir Henry Allsopp, 1st Baronet. He was head of the brewing firm of Samuel Allsopp & Sons of Burton upon Trent, and he also represented East Worcestershire in Parliament.

Allsopp had already been created a baronet, of Hindlip Hall in the Parish of Hindlip in the County of Worcester, in the Baronetage of the United Kingdom on 7 May 1880. His son, the second Baron, was also head of the family firm and sat as Conservative Member of Parliament for Staffordshire East and Taunton. His son, the third Baron, was a junior Unionist whip in the House of Lords from 1907 to 1914; and awarded Order of the British Empire in 1919. The third Baron's younger son, the fifth Baron (who succeeded his elder brother), was a Deputy Lieutenant of Wiltshire. , the titles are held by the latter's son, the sixth Baron, who succeeded in 1993.

Television presenters Kirstie and Sofie Allsopp are daughters of the sixth Baron.

Barons Hindlip (1886)
Henry Allsopp, 1st Baron Hindlip (1811–1887)
Samuel Charles Allsopp, 2nd Baron Hindlip (1842–1897)
Charles Allsopp, 3rd Baron Hindlip (1877–1931)
Charles Samuel Victor Allsopp, 4th Baron Hindlip (1906–1966); elder son of the 3rd Baron
Henry Richard Allsopp, 5th Baron Hindlip (1912–1993); younger son of the 3rd Baron
Charles Henry Allsopp, 6th Baron Hindlip (born 1940)

The heir apparent is the present holder's only son, the Hon. Henry William Allsopp (born 1973).

Male-line family tree

Coat of arms

References

Books cited

External links

Baronies in the Peerage of the United Kingdom
Noble titles created in 1886
Noble titles created for UK MPs
People from Burton upon Trent